Black Angels may refer to:

 Black Angels (Crumb), a 1970 composition for string quartet by George Crumb
 Black Angels (album), a 1990 album by Kronos Quartet, featuring Crumb's composition
 The Black Angels (band), an American rock band
 The Black Angels (EP), a 2005 EP
 The Black Angels, a 1926 novel by Maud Hart Lovelace
 The Black Angels, a 1970 outlaw biker film
 Brussels Black Angels, a Belgian Football League team
 Los Ángeles Negros, a Latin pop group

See also 
 The Black Angel (disambiguation)